Anax immaculifrons, the magnificent emperor, or blue darner, is a species of dragonfly in the family Aeshnidae. It is found in many Asian countries and very few European countries.

Description and habitat
It is a large, bluish green dragonfly with sapphire-blue eyes, bluish-green thorax, and pale reddish-brown abdomen marked with black. Its thorax is pale bluish-green on dorsum with a blackish-brown mid-dorsal carina and turquoise-blue laterally. There is a narrow black stripe over humeral suture and a very broad one over the postero-lateral suture with a narrow black posterior border on metepimeron. Wings are transparent with amber-yellow tint. Segment 1 of the abdomen is entirely black. Segment 2 is turquoise-blue, with a mid-dorsal transverse mark shaped like a sea-gull in flight. Segment 3 has its basal half turquoise-blue and apical half black, with a small mid-dorsal spot on blue. Segments 4 to 8 are with apical half black and pale reddish-brown at base. Segment 9 and 10 are black on dorsum.

It is found near slow flowing hill streams where it breeds. Eggs are inserted into reeds emerging from water.

See also 
 List of Odonata species of Australia
 List of odonata species of India
 List of odonata of Kerala

References

External links
 World Dragonflies
 Animal diversity web
 Query Results

Aeshnidae
Insects described in 1842